The Pare Hydro Electric Project is a NTPC NEEPCO situated in the Dikrong River which is a tributary of  Brahmaputra river the Papum Pare District of Arunachal Pradesh.Total installed capacity of project is 110 MW

The project was constructed by four contractors:
  Hindustan Construction Company Ltd. - Civil Works
 Precision Infratech - Hydro-Mechanical Works
 Andritz Hydro - Electro-Mechanical Works 
 Alstom T&D India Ltd (Alstom Group) - Transformer & Switchyard

References

Electric power companies of India